The  is a volcanic group of peaks arranged around the  wide  caldera in Hokkaidō, Japan. In the Ainu language it is known as Nutapukaushipe (which means "the mountain above the river"), Nutaku Kamushupe, or Optateske. These peaks are the highest in Hokkaidō. The group lends its name to the Daisetsuzan National Park in which the volcanic group is located.

Geography
The volcanic group lies at the north end of the Daisetsu-Tokachi graben on the Kurile arc of the Ring of Fire. The volcanic zone makes itself known through a number of fumaroles and natural hot springs.

List of mountains by height
The following peaks make up the volcanic group:

See also
100 Soundscapes of Japan
Tourism in Japan
List of volcanoes in Japan

References

Hokkaipedia, Daisetsuzan Mountains, last access 2 July 2008.
 Teikoku's Complete Atlas of Japan, Teikoku Shoin Co., Ltd, Tokyo 1990,

External links 
 Taisetsuzan - Japan Meteorological Agency 
 Taisetsuzan: National catalogue of the active volcanoes in Japan - Japan Meteorological Agency
 Taisetsu Volcano Group - Geological Survey of Japan
 Taisetsuzan - Smithsonian Institution: Global Volcanism Program

Volcanoes of Hokkaido
Natural monuments of Japan
Volcanism of Japan
Volcanic groups